Calochortus elegans is a species of flowering plant in the lily family known by the common name elegant Mariposa lily, cat's ear, elegant cat's ears or star tulip. It is native to the western United States from northern California to Montana.

It is a perennial herb producing a slender, generally unbranched stem up to 15 centimeters in height. The basal leaf is 10 to 20 centimeters long and does not wither at flowering. The inflorescence bears 1 to 7 erect bell-shaped flowers. Each flower has three sepals and three petals with very hairy inner surfaces and edges. Each petal is greenish white in color with a purple crescent above a hairless patch at the base. The fruit is a winged capsule about 2 centimeters long.

The bulb is a choice wild root vegetable when eaten cooked, and can be eaten raw to avoid starvation.

Varieties
 Calochortus elegans var. amoenus (Greene) auct.
 Calochortus elegans var. amoenus hort.
 Calochortus elegans var. elegans Pursh - Idaho, Oregon, Washington
 Calochortus elegans var. lobbii Baker
 Calochortus elegans var. major Hook.
 Calochortus elegans var. minor Hook.
 Calochortus elegans var. nanus Alph.Wood - Oregon, northern California
 Calochortus elegans var. oreophilus Ownbey
 Calochortus elegans var. selwayensis (H.St.John) Ownbey - Idaho, Montana
 Calochortus elegans var. subclavatus Baker

References

Further reading 
 Calochortus elegans Hook.f. Bot. Mag. 98: t. 5976. 1872
 Calochortus elegans Baker J. Linn. Soc., Bot. 14: 305. 1874 [1875 publ. 1874]
 Calochortus elegans Pursh Fl. Amer. Sept. (Pursh) 1: 240. 1813 [Dec 1813]
 Calochortus elegans Pursh Fl. Amer. Sept. (Pursh) 1: 240. 1813 [dt. 1814; issued Dec 1813]

External links 
 
  Calflora Database: Calochortus elegans (Elegant mariposa lily,  Northwestern mariposa lily)
  USDA Plants Profile for Calochortus elegans (elegant mariposa lily)
  Jepson Manual eFlora (TJM2) treatment of Calochortus elegans
 UC Photos gallery of Calochortus elegans
 Calochortus elegans at eppo.int (EPPO code CCUEL)
 Calochortus elegans at global names 

elegans
Flora of California
Flora of the Northwestern United States
Flora of the Klamath Mountains
Plants described in 1813
Root vegetables
Taxa named by Frederick Traugott Pursh